Scotforth is a civil parish in Lancaster, Lancashire, England. It does not include the suburb of Scotforth. It contains five listed buildings that are recorded in the National Heritage List for England.  All of the listed buildings are designated at Grade II, the lowest of the three grades, which is applied to "buildings of national importance and special interest".  The parish is mainly rural, and four of the listed buildings are houses, farmhouses and farm buildings.  The other listed structure is a bridge crossing the River Conder that passes through the parish.

Buildings

References

Citations

Sources

Lists of listed buildings in Lancashire
Buildings and structures in the City of Lancaster